Adistemia is a genus of beetles in the family Latridiidae, containing the following species:

 Adistemia bicarinata (Belon, 1897)
 Adistemia chilenisi Dajoz, 1974
 Adistemia ciliata Dajoz, 1967
 Adistemia convexa Dajoz, 1967
 Adistemia jeanneli Dajoz, 1960
 Adistemia microphthalma Dajoz, 1967
 Adistemia minuta Dajoz, 1967
 Adistemia petiti Dajoz, 1960
 Adistemia prenanti Dajoz, 1960
 Adistemia pubescens Dajoz, 1967
 Adistemia rileyi Hinton, 1941
 Adistemia watsoni (Wollaston, 1871)

References

Latridiidae genera